"Cold Water" is a song by American electronic dance music production group Major Lazer, featuring vocals from Canadian singer Justin Bieber and Danish singer MØ. The song was released on July 22, 2016, as the lead single from their debut greatest hits album, Major Lazer Essentials. It became Major Lazer's third collaboration with MØ after "Lean On" and "Lost".

"Cold Water" peaked at number one on the UK Singles Chart and number two on the US Billboard Hot 100. The song also reached number one in Australia, Austria, Belgium (Wallonia), Brazil, Canada, Finland, Ireland, Italy, the Netherlands, New Zealand, Norway, Portugal, Sweden and Switzerland; as well as the top 10 in Belgium (Flanders), Denmark, France, Germany, Greece, Iceland, Israel, Lebanon, Luxembourg, Mexico, Scotland, South Africa and Spain.

Background and release

The day before Diplo arrived in New York City in May 2016, he was "more than a little surprised" when Justin Bieber sent a message on Twitter about the track, "Cold Water", asking when it would be coming out. "That was not planned at all," Diplo said. According to Diplo, the song wasn't really done, when Bieber already expressed his excitement. "It's actually very real. Twitter is the only reason I know he's excited about the song. I don't have his number, so he Twitters at me," Diplo added. On May 30, Diplo announced Major Lazer's collaboration with Bieber and MØ. At the time, he did not give a specific release date, only mentioning it would be released "in a couple of weeks" and that it would premiere through Beats 1.

The song initially started a project, which eventually built to Major Lazer's fourth studio album's January 2017 release. "It's complicated because we just want to do it indie," described Diplo of "Cold Water." "And convincing Bieber's marketing crew to do that is hard. We don't need to have some guy tell us, 'Oh, this is what the market research says.' I'm on the ground. I see it." 

On July 1, 2016, Bieber began releasing teasers of the song, and added the song would come out later that month. On July 13, he wrote the release date was set for July 22. A low-quality version of the track leaked on Chinese radio station in July 2016, four days prior to its official release. After the latter incident, "Cold Water" was officially released on July 22, 2016. Moreover, it was sent to US Top 40 radio on July 26, 2016.

Remix
The official remix of "Cold Water" features a newly additional verse and replaces Bieber's second verse and the first half of Bieber's second pre-chorus by rapper Gucci Mane. It was first mentioned by both Bieber and Mane through social media. Diplo premiered the remix during Brunch Bounce at Elvis Guesthouse in New York City on July 22, 2016, the same day the original version was released. It was later released online on August 12, 2016. Mane's verse replaces Bieber's second verse and the first half of Bieber's second pre-chorus, while the rest of the song remains the same as the original version.

Composition
"Cold Water", a mid-tempo song, includes dancehall and Euro club music influences, while featuring "vibrant electronic chords and coastal beats [with] a hook-heavy pop influence" and acoustic guitars. Jacob Stolworthy of The Independent noted similarities between the song and Bieber's "Love Yourself", which was also written by Bieber, Blanco and Sheeran.

The song is written in the key of A major with a common time tempo of 93 beats per minute. The vocals span from E3 to G#5 in the song with a chord progression of F#mAC#mD.

Critical reception
"Cold Water" received positive reviews from music critics. Newsweek Tufayel Ahmed and Digital Spy Megan Davies called it a future summer hit. Raisa Bruner of Time shared the same opinion, explaining: "This is the kind of jam you want to play as you road trip with the windows down; the kind of catchy slow-burn that gives you feels but will also get you going at a dance party." Jezebel deemed it "perfect for a lazy summer day with your friends". Anna Gaca of Spin described it as a "copacetic electronic ballad".

The New York Times Jon Caramanica was less enthusiastic towards the song, writing: "Bieber's earlier collaborations with Diplo (and also Skrillex) worked because of the frisson of the young pop star getting tugged onto the producers’ turf. But with 'Cold Water', Mr. Bieber's new collaboration with Diplo's Major Lazer project — which also includes an appearance by the singer MØ — the gravity pulls in the other direction." Calling the song "tepid", he concluded: "The return, near the song's end, of the flute-that's-not-actually-a-flute that was such a radical injection the last time around, here feels like an act of desperation."

Billboard ranked "Cold Water" at number 56 on their "Billboard's 100 Best Pop Songs of 2016" list.

Commercial performance
In the United States, "Cold Water" debuted at number two, behind Sia's "Cheap Thrills", on the Billboard Hot 100, becoming Bieber's third number-two debut on the chart, passing Mariah Carey's record to become the artist with the most number-two debuts; he also leads with the most top-two debuts at five. Additionally, "Cold Water" becomes the second top 10 single and highest-charting single for both Major Lazer and MØ in the United States, as well as Bieber's eleventh top 10 single. The song went up and down in the top 5 back to number two, while The Chainsmokers' "Closer" featuring Halsey dethroned Sia's "Cheap Thrills". The single opened at number one on Digital Songs with 169,000 downloads, becoming Major Lazer and MØ's first, and Bieber's fifth, leader on the chart and their biggest sales week to date. It also debuted atop the Streaming Songs and On-Demand Songs charts.

In the United Kingdom, "Cold Water" debuted at number one on the UK Singles Chart, on the issue dated July 29, 2016, with 102,000 combined sales, which included 5.56 million streams and 47,000 downloads. By debuting at number one, it ended a fifteen-week run at the top of the chart by Drake's "One Dance" and was the second song to debut at number one in 2016, after "Pillowtalk" by Zayn Malik in February. Additionally, the song became Major Lazer and MØ's first number-one single and Bieber's fourth. It also marks the first time two Danish acts have reached number one in the same year (with the other being Lukas Graham's "7 Years"). On the ARIA Singles Chart, "Cold Water" also debuted at number one, giving Major Lazer their second number-one single in Australia.

Track listing

Charts

Weekly charts

Year-end charts

Decade-end charts

Certifications

Release history

References

External links
 

2016 singles
2016 songs
Justin Bieber songs
Major Lazer songs
MØ songs
Canadian Hot 100 number-one singles
Dutch Top 40 number-one singles
Number-one singles in Australia
Number-one singles in Austria
Number-one singles in New Zealand
Number-one singles in Norway
Number-one singles in Portugal
Number-one singles in Sweden
Irish Singles Chart number-one singles
UK Singles Chart number-one singles
Songs written by Ed Sheeran
Songs written by Diplo
Songs written by Justin Bieber
Songs written by MØ
Songs written by King Henry (producer)
Songs written by Jr Blender
Song recordings produced by Benny Blanco